Secreto de confesión (English title: Secret confession) is a Mexican telenovela produced by Ernesto Alonso for Televisa in 1980.

Cast 
Silvia Derbez as Alicia
Gustavo Rojo as Jorge
Nelly Meden as Roxana
Tere Valadez as Matilde
Graciela Doring as Lucha
Úrsula Prats as Carmela
Yolanda Ciani as Luisa
Rafael Sánchez Navarro as Gustavo
Miguel Ángel Ferriz as Carlos
Kiko Campos as Raul
Roger Cudney as Burton
Mario Sauret as Julio
Eduardo Castell as Priest Javier
Humberto Osuna as Felipe
Mariela Flores as Julia
Maristel Molina as Emilia
Marissa del Carmen as Aurelia
Bertha Moss as Beatriz

References

External links 

Mexican telenovelas
1980 telenovelas
Televisa telenovelas
Spanish-language telenovelas
1980 Mexican television series debuts
1980 Mexican television series endings